This is a list of lighthouses in Svalbard.

Lighthouses

See also
 Lists of lighthouses and lightvessels

References

External links

 

Svalbard
Lighthouses

Svalbard